Évian-les-Bains, or simply Évian  (or ), is a commune in the northern part of the Haute-Savoie department in the Auvergne-Rhône-Alpes region, Southeastern France. In 2018, it had a population of 9,100.

A high-market holiday resort and spa town on the shores of Lake Geneva, it has been visited, over two centuries, by royalty such as Kings Edward VII and George V of the United Kingdom and King Farouk of Egypt, and celebrities such as countess Anna de Noailles and Marcel Proust.

History

Birth of an elite spa town

The springs of Evian were still rather unknown at the time of the French Revolution. But the First Empire's interest for spa towns inspired a scientist to analyse the Evian springs in 1807 and 1808.

A lakeside port and a new road (RN5) connecting the town to Milan and Paris were constructed in 1809. In 1823, Genevan entrepreneur M. Fauconnet launched the Évian mineral water company (Société des Eaux Minérales d'Évian) and purchased the cities' two main springs (the better-known being the Cachat spring named after the family that sold it) in March 1827. M. Fauconnet's company eventually went bankrupt, and the springs were bought by the Hôtel des Bains.

In the following years, many hotels (Hôtel des quatre saisons, Hôtel de France, Hôtel des Alpes) were built, helping the town's popularity as a holiday resort.

Golden Age of the Belle epoque and the Roaring Twenties

The Cachat mineral waters SA (Société Anonyme des Eaux Minérales de Cachat) was created as an anonymous company in December 1859 by Parisian investors, selling Évian water, and in 1865 the small town changed its name to Évian-les-bains to promote its rise as a spa town. Three other springs joined the Cachat (Guillot, Bonnevie, Corporau). Improvement in transportation (a railroad station) helped make the town a more famous spa.

In the late 19th century, the city contained more than 20 hotels. The hills and the lakeshore were covered with noble houses and luxurious villas and a theatre and a casino were built on the lakeside. In 1902, the baths were constructed and in 1909, the architect Hébrard built one of the most luxurious hotels: the Royal Hotel. Evian considers itself one of the top European spas, claiming popularity with high society figures such as Countess Anna de Noailles, Frédéric Mistral, the Lumiere Brothers and Marcel Proust.

After World War I, the city maintained its status as a high-class spa town, hosting socialites and royalty such as Aga Khan III, the Maharaja of Kapurthala, Albert Lebrun (President of the République), King George V of United Kingdom and King Fuad I of Egypt.

The Évian Conference was convened in Évian in July 1938 to discuss the problem of Jewish refugees. During World War II, German forces occupied Évian and the town's statue of General Dupas was removed.

Contemporary

The Évian Accords, which ended the Algerian War and recognized an independent Algeria, were signed there on 18 March 1962. The G8 began its 29th summit meeting in Évian on 1 June 2003.
From 26 to 30 August 2015 the 6th Annual Summit of the G-20Y Association was held there.

Évian still derives funding as a holiday resort and spa town.

Geography

Climate
The climate is continental mountainous, characterized by a marked humidity. Winters are cold and snowy and the summer season is mild with occasional stormy episodes. The off-seasons (April and October) are also on average relatively humid.

Economy
The town is home to Évian mineral water, which adds significantly to the economy, together with the Casino d'Evian, the largest themed casino in Europe, and the Evian Royal Resort, the reported favorite holiday destination of former French President François Mitterrand and King Farouk of Egypt. Many of the inhabitants of Évian work in Lausanne and other Swiss cities nearby.

The two largest hotels in Évian are the Hotel Royal (where the G8 summit was held) and the Hilton.

Transport

Évian is served by a bus network, as well as a train station with regular trains to Geneva, Annemasse, and Bellegarde, as well as less frequent services to Paris and Lyon. There is also a very busy ferry service running between the town and Lausanne, as well as a more tourist-centered service that runs to Yvoire.

Education
Public nursery/preschools and primary schools serving the town include: Ecole du Centre, Ecole de la Détanche, Ecoles du Mur Blanc, and Ecole des Hauts d'Evian. Collège des Rives du Léman is the public junior high school, and Lycée Anna de Noailles is the senior high school.

Ecole Saint-Bruno is a private nursery/preschool, primary school, and junior high school.

Sport 
The town has some golf courses, and hosts The Evian Championship women's professional golf tournament, founded in 1994, every summer. Now it is one of the five women's major championships.

The Evian Thonon Gaillard F.C. football club was located here before relocating to Thonon-les-Bains.

The Club de l'Aviron d'Évian is the local rowing club.

Population

Notable people
 The French ski mountaineer Patrick Blanc was born in Évian in 1972.
 The Napoleonic General Dupas was also born in Évian.
 In the 1818 novel Frankenstein; or, The Modern Prometheus, by Mary Shelley, Victor Frankenstein spends the first night of his honeymoon in Évian, but cannot prevent his monster from strangling his young wife Elizabeth. Mary Shelley travelled through Évian with her partner, the famous English poet Percy Bysshe Shelley, in the early 1810s, and in a published book about their travels he wrote of the town in this manner: "The appearance of the inhabitants is more wretched, diseased and poor, than I ever recollect to have seen."

See also
Communes of the Haute-Savoie department
List of G8 summit resorts

References

External links

 Évian-les-Bains 
 Evian Tourism
 G8 meeting in Évian
Evian on Flags of the World

Communes of Haute-Savoie
Spa towns in France
Populated places on Lake Geneva